Alenka Dovžan (born 11 February 1976) is a retired Slovenian alpine skier.

World Cup results

Season standings

Race podiums

Olympic Games results

World Championships results

References 

1976 births
Living people
Slovenian female alpine skiers
Alpine skiers at the 1994 Winter Olympics
Alpine skiers at the 1998 Winter Olympics
Alpine skiers at the 2002 Winter Olympics
Olympic alpine skiers of Slovenia
Olympic bronze medalists for Slovenia
Olympic medalists in alpine skiing
Medalists at the 1994 Winter Olympics
People from the Municipality of Kranjska Gora